Arnold Kenneth Jackson (21 June 1903 – 31 May 1971) was an English cricketer.  Jackson was a right-handed batsman who bowled right-arm fast-medium.  He was born at Edgbaston, Warwickshire.

Jackson made two first-class appearances for Warwickshire against Nottinghamshire at Trent Bridge, Nottingham in 1928, and Kent at the Mitchells and Butlers' Ground, Birmingham in 1931.  Jackson had little success in these two matches, scoring a total of 5 runs and bowling a total of fifteen wicketless overs.

He died at Halstenbek, Schleswig-Holstein, West Germany on 31 May 1971.

References

External links
Arnold Jackson at ESPNcricinfo
Arnold Jackson at CricketArchive

1903 births
1971 deaths
People from Edgbaston
English cricketers
Warwickshire cricketers